or Edogawa City Natural Zoo is a zoo located in Edogawa, Tokyo Prefecture, Japan.

References

Tourist attractions in Tokyo
Zoos in Japan